Peter Aaron Ho (born February 3, 1971), known by the stage name Pete Miser, is an American Hip Hop rapper and producer living in New York City.

Biography 
Originally from Portland, Oregon, Miser is involved in the hip-hop scene in the Northwest United States. He was the lead vocalist in the live hip-hop band Five Fingers of Funk.

After six years with the Fingers, Miser moved to Brooklyn, New York City to explore hip-hop in its birthplace. In 1999, Arista artist Dido recruited him as the DJ in her live band. With Dido, Miser toured the world, appeared on numerous television shows.

In past years Miser was also a featured in the final Top 6 of the MTV2 Dew Circuit Breakout.

Miser's music has been featured in numerous major motion pictures including but not limited to "The Night Listener", "TATS Cru: The Mural Kings" & the ESPN documentary "Through The Fire", as well as three exclusive Bacardi commercials featuring his song "Only For Today".

Miser was featured in the pH10 single from 2003, titled "Needless to Say."

In early 2008, Miser released a YouTube video for short song "Hit Me On My iPhone".

He produced and is featured in Jin's song "Open Letter to Obama".

Discography

Albums

Other Appearances

References

External links 

Living people
Rappers from Oregon
Musicians from Portland, Oregon
Musicians from Brooklyn
1971 births
American musicians of Chinese descent
21st-century American rappers